Khakabad (also Romanized as Khākābād; also known as Khāk Bād) is a village in Khomeh Rural District, in the Central District of Aligudarz County, Lorestan Province, Iran. At the 2006 census, its population was 139, in 28 families.

References 

Towns and villages in Aligudarz County